Baghak (also Romanized as Bāghaḵ) is a village in Jajrud Rural District, in the Jajrud District of Pardis County, Tehran Province, Iran. At the 2006 census, its population was 43, in 16 families.

References 

Populated places in Pardis County